German submarine U-414 was a Type VIIC U-boat built for Nazi Germany's Kriegsmarine for service during World War II.
She was laid down on 14 June 1941 by Danziger Werft, Danzig as yard number 115, launched on 25 March 1942 and commissioned on 1 July 1942 under Oberleutnant zur See Walther Huth.

Design
German Type VIIC submarines were preceded by the shorter Type VIIB submarines. U-414 had a displacement of  when at the surface and  while submerged. She had two shafts and two  propellers.

U-414 was fitted with five  torpedo tubes (four fitted at the bow and one at the stern), fourteen torpedoes, one  SK C/35 naval gun, 220 rounds, and two twin  C/30 anti-aircraft guns. The boat had a complement of between forty-four and sixty.

Service history
The boat's career began with training at 8th U-boat Flotilla on 1 July 1942, followed by active service on 1 January 1943 as part of the 6th Flotilla. Four months later, on 1 May 1943, she transferred to 29th Flotilla for operations in the Mediterranean for the short remainder of her service.

Wolfpacks
U-414 took part in two wolfpacks, namely:
 Falke (15 – 19 January 1943)
 Haudegen (19 January – 2 February 1943)

Fate
All hands were lost.

Summary of raiding history

See also
 Mediterranean U-boat Campaign (World War II)

References

Bibliography

External links

German Type VIIC submarines
1942 ships
U-boats commissioned in 1942
Ships lost with all hands
U-boats sunk in 1943
U-boats sunk by depth charges
U-boats sunk by British warships
World War II shipwrecks in the Mediterranean Sea
World War II submarines of Germany
Ships built in Danzig
Maritime incidents in May 1943